Le diamant noir may refer to:
 The Black Diamond (1922 film), a French silent mystery film
 The Black Diamond (1941 film), a French drama film